Mobile Home is the second and final album by Longpigs, released in 1999 on U2's record label, Mother.

Track listing

All songs written by Crispin Hunt unless otherwise stated.

"The Frank Sonata" – 3:53 
"Blue Skies" – 4:01
"Gangsters" – 4:56 
"Free Toy" (Hunt, Richard Hawley) – 4:43
"Baby Blue" (Hunt, Simon Stafford) – 3:56
"Dance Baby Dance" (Hunt, Hawley, Stafford)  – 4:17 
"Miss Believer" – 4:22
"I Lied I Love You" – 4:43 
"Keep the Light Alight" – 3:40  
"Speech Bubble" – 3:47
"Dog Is Dead" – 4:02
"Loud and Clear" (Hunt, Hawley) – 3:10
"In the Snow" – 4:30

References

External links

Mobile Home at YouTube (streamed copy where licensed)

Longpigs albums
1999 albums
Albums produced by Stephen Street
Albums produced by Kevin Bacon (producer)
Albums produced by Jonathan Quarmby